Desiring God  may refer to:
 Desiring God (ministry), a ministry founded by John Piper
Desiring God (album), an album by Steve Camp